Vinicio Sofia (13 November 1907 – 30 December 1982) was an Italian actor and voice actor.

Biography
Born in Corleone, Sofia began his career on screen in 1933 when he made his film debut in Black Shirt directed by Giovacchino Forzano. He appeared in over 66 films between 1933 and 1973 although he was mostly active as an actor during the 1940s and among his most popular filmography includes the 1953 comedy film Neapolitan Turk. Throughout his career, he collaborated with other actors such as Alberto Sordi, Luigi Pavese, Erminio Macario and Totò.

Sofia also maintained a successful career as a voice actor and dubber. He dubbed many actors which include James Whitmore, Andy Devine, Jack Carson, Slim Pickens, William Conrad and Eddie Cantor. In his animated film roles. He provided the Italian voices of characters in Disney films. These include Br'er Bear in Song of the South, Horace in One Hundred and One Dalmatians and Carpenter and Tweedledum in Alice in Wonderland.

Sofia retired in the early 1970s and he died in Rome a decade later.

Filmography

Black Shirt (1933)
L'avvocato difensore (1934)
Seconda B (1934)
Loyalty of Love (1934)
Everybody's Woman (1934)
100 Days of Napoleon (1935)
I'll Give a Million (1935)
The Magnificent Rogue (1935)
Ginevra degli Almieri (1935)
Continental Atmosphere (1936)
Bertoldo, Bertoldino e Cacasenno (1936)
A Woman Between Two Worlds (1936)
But It's Nothing Serious (1936)
 Tomb of the Angels (1937)
It Was I! (1937)
Doctor Antonio (1937)
The Count of Brechard (1938)
Hurricane in the Tropics (1939)
Lo vedi come sei... lo vedi come sei? (1939)
Follie del secolo (1939)
Non me lo dire! (1940)
Ragazza che dorme (1940)
Sei bambine e il Perseo (1940)
Don Buonaparte (1941)
Caravaggio (1941)
The King of England Will Not Pay (1941)
Villa da vendere (1941)
Romanzo di un giovane povero (1942)
The Countess of Castiglione (1942)
Before the Postman (1942)
The Boy of the West (1943)
I Do Not Move! (1943)
Macario Against Zagomar (1944)
La Fornarina (1944)
Vietato ai minorenni (1944)
L'innocente Casimiro (1945)
The Za-Bum Circus (1945)
 The Innocent Casimiro (1945)
Toto Tours Italy (1948)
Fear and Sand (1948)
Little Lady (1949)
Dead Woman's Kiss (1949)
Fabiola (1949)
The Thief of Venice (1950)
 The Merry Widower (1950)
Totò Tarzan (1950)
 Mamma Mia, What an Impression! (1951)
Accidents to the Taxes!! (1951)
 The Adventures of Mandrin (1952)
I morti non pagano tasse (1952)
Neapolitan Turk (1953)
Bertoldo, Bertoldino e Cacasenno (1954) - Remake 
Are We Men or Corporals? (1955)
Ladro lui, ladra lei (1958)
Scandali al mare (1961)
 The Triumph of Robin Hood (1962)
The Motorized Women (1963)
The Snatching (1965)
We Are All in Temporary Liberty (1971)
Le mille e una notte... e un'altra ancora! (1973)

References

External links

1907 births
1982 deaths
Italian male film actors
Italian male voice actors
Italian male television actors
People from Corleone
20th-century Italian male actors
Actors from Sicily